Sones are units of perceived loudness.

Sones may also refer to:
Sonya Sones
F. Mason Sones
Kye Sones
Fandom of the South Korean pop band Girls' Generation

See also
Sone (disambiguation)